Bernardo Añor Guillamón (born 7 October 1959) is a Venezuelan footballer. He competed in the men's tournament at the 1980 Summer Olympics.

Personal life
He is father of professional footballers Bernardo Jr. and Juan Pablo.

References

1959 births
Living people
Venezuelan footballers
Venezuela international footballers
Olympic footballers of Venezuela
Footballers at the 1980 Summer Olympics
Footballers from Caracas
Association football forwards